Ladoni (Palms) is a 1994 Russian documentary film directed by Artur Aristakisyan.

Synopsis 
A man tries to communicate with his unborn son and contemplates what it means to be human through the faces of people that he encounters.

References

External links 
 

1994 films
Russian documentary films
Films shot in Russia
Films directed by Artur Aristakisyan
Black-and-white documentary films
1990s Russian-language films
1994 documentary films
Gerasimov Institute of Cinematography